Abdoulaye Sylla may refer to:
Abdoulaye Kapi Sylla (born 1982), Guinean former football midfielder
Abdoulaye Sylla (footballer, born 1995), Guinean football goalkeeper for Hafia
Abdoulaye Sylla (footballer, born 2000), Guinean football defender for Nantes